The 2007 Women's NORCECA Volleyball Championship was the 20th edition of the Women's Continental Volleyball Tournament, played by eight countries from September 17 to September 22, 2007 in Winnipeg, Manitoba, Canada. Cuba defeated the United States to conquer the gold medal and the Dominican Republic won the bronze medal over the hosts Canada. Cuban athlete Nancy Carrillo won the Most Valuable Player award.

Competing Nations

Squads

Preliminary round

Group A
Monday September 17

Tuesday September 18

Wednesday September 19

Group B
Monday September 17

Tuesday September 18

Wednesday September 19

Final round

Quarter-finals
Thursday September 20

Semi-finals
Friday September 21 — 5th/8th place

Friday September 21 — 1st/4th place

Finals
Saturday September 22 — Seventh Place Match

Saturday September 22 — Fifth Place Match

Saturday September 22 — Bronze Medal Match

Saturday September 22 — Gold Medal Match

Final ranking

Cuba and the United States qualified for the 2007 FIVB Women's World Cup

Awards

Most Valuable Player
  Nancy Carrillo

Best Scorer
  Bethania de la Cruz

Best Spiker
  Nancy Carrillo

Best Blocker
  Nancy Carrillo

Best Server
  Áurea Cruz
Best Digger
  Deborah Seilhamer

Best Setter
  Vilmarie Mojica

Best Passer
  Stacey Gordon

Best Libero
  Carmen Rosa Caso

References

 Results

Women's NORCECA Volleyball Championship
N
N
Volleyball